Maxim Eduardovich Belugin (born ) is a Russian bobsledder. In December 2017, he was one of eleven Russian athletes who were banned for life from the Olympics by the International Olympic Committee, after doping offences at the 2014 Winter Olympics.

Career
Belugin competed at the 2014 Winter Olympics for Russia. He teamed with driver Alexander Kasjanov in the Russia-2 sled in the two-man event and with Kasjanov, Ilvir Huzin and Aleksei Pushkarev in the four-man event, finishing fourth in both competitions, missing out on the bronze medal position by three-hundredths of a second in each event. All three of his teammates were later disqualified and banned for life from the Olympics for doping offences, and the result of the team was annulled.

As of April 2014, his best showing at the World Championships is 6th, in the 2011 mixed team event. His best finish in an Olympic discipline is 10th, coming in the four-man event in both 2011 and 2013.

Belugin made his World Cup debut in November 2008. As of April 2014, he has five World Cup podium finishes, with the best a pair of silver medals at Whistler.

World Cup Podiums

References

1985 births
Living people
Olympic bobsledders of Russia
People from Krasnokamensky District
Bobsledders at the 2014 Winter Olympics
Russian male bobsledders
Doping cases in bobsleigh
Russian sportspeople in doping cases
Sportspeople from Zabaykalsky Krai